For divisional competitions, see: 2009 Asian Five Nations division tournaments

The 2009 Asian Five Nations, known as the 2009 HSBC Asian 5 Nations due to its sponsorship by HSBC, was the second series of the rugby union Asian Five Nations, the flagship competition devised by the International Rugby Board to develop the sport in the Asian region. The tournament played a role in qualifying for the 2011 Rugby World Cup, with Singapore, the last place team, being relegated to Division 1. As the 2010 edition will serve as the final round of Asian qualifying, Singapore is effectively eliminated.

Changes from 2008
 Arabian Gulf has been replaced with Singapore, who earns promotion from Division 1.

Teams
The teams involved, with their world rankings pre tournament, were:

  (31)
  (16)
  (34)
  (23)
  (49)

Final Table

Scoring System
Win – 5 Points
Draw – 3 Points
Loss – 0 Points
Bonus points for scoring four tries or for losing by no more than 7 points.
Results

Fixture overview

Fixtures

References

https://web.archive.org/web/20090407082740/http://www.irb.com/mm/document/newsmedia/0/090302hsbcasianfivenations2009seriesschedule_7322.pdf

Asian
2009
Five Nations
Five Nations
2009 in South Korean sport
2009 in Hong Kong sport
2009 in Singaporean sport
2009 in Kazakhstani sport